UX, Ux, or ux may refer to:

Astronomical objects
 UX Antliae, a post-AGB star in Corona Borealis
 UX Arietis, a triple star system
 UX Lyncis, a dim, red-hued star in Lynx
 UX Tauri, a binary star system

Computing

Software
 LG UX
 Unix, an operating system family
 A/UX, by Apple Computer  (1988–1995)
 DG/UX, by Data General (1985–2001)
 HP-UX, by Hewlett-Packard   (1982–)

Other uses in computing
 User experience, a person's behaviors, attitudes, and emotions about using a product, system, or service
 Sony Vaio UX Micro PC, a 2006 laptop brand
 iHub UX Lab, Nairobi, Kenya

Language
 Ux., legal shorthand for 'wife'; see Et uxor
 Ux or ux, a digraph substitute for Ŭ or ŭ in Esperanto's X-system ASCII transliteration

Transportation

Businesses
 Air Europa (IATA code: UX)
 United Express, a brand of United Airlines

Vehicles
 Lexus UX, a Japanese subcompact SUV
 LF-UX, a concept preview of the car
 SM U-10 (Austria-Hungary) (or U-X), the lead boat of the U-10 class of submarines of the Austro-Hungarian Navy

Other uses
 les UX, an underground organization that improves parts of Paris
 Uranium-X, historical name for the chemical element protactinium
 Niigata Television Network 21, a Japanese commercial broadcaster